Parotocinclus variola is a species of catfish in the family Loricariidae. It is native to South America, where it reportedly occurs in a blackwater creek known as Quebrada Tacana, which is a tributary of the Amazon River in Colombia. The species inhabits sandy areas and reaches 2.9 cm (1.1 inches) SL.

References 

Loricariidae
Fish of Colombia
Otothyrinae